1861 in archaeology

Explorations
 First scientific investigations of Nalanda Mahavihara in Bihar.
 British archaeologist Alexander Cunningham identifies the ancient city of Vaishali with the present-day village of Basrah in Bihar.

Excavations
 June - First modern excavation of the Neolithic chambered cairn and passage grave of Maeshowe on Orkney by James Farrer.
 Excavation of Long Hole Cave in Glamorgan reveals prehistoric flint artefacts.
 Excavation of Umm al-Amad, Lebanon, by Ernest Renan, abandoned when he finds that the ruins are only about two thousand years old.
 Excavation of Vergina by Leon Heuzey.

Finds

Publications
 Edward Burnett Tylor - Anahuac: Or Mexico and the Mexicans, Ancient and Modern.

Events
 Archaeological Survey of India founded.

Births
 October 6 - Gaston Cros, French army officer and archaeologist (killed in action 1915)

Deaths

See also
 List of years in archaeology
 1860 in archaeology
 1862 in archaeology

References

Archaeology
Archaeology by year
Archaeology
Archaeology